The 1988 Georgia Bulldogs football team represented the University of Georgia during the 1988 NCAA Division I-A football season. This was Vince Dooley's final season as head coach.

Schedule

Personnel

References

Georgia
Georgia Bulldogs football seasons
Gator Bowl champion seasons
Georgia Bulldogs football